Lion's Roar or The Lion's Roar may refer to:

 Roar (vocalization)

Media
 Lion's Roar (magazine) (formerly Shambhala Sun), Buddhist magazine
 The Lion's Roar (Southeastern Louisiana University), student newspaper
 The Lion's Roar (publication), periodical of Liberty High School, Brentwood, California

Music
 Lion's roar (instrument), membranophone musical instrument
 The Lion's Roar (album), 2012 album by Swedish band First Aid Kit
 "The Lion's Roar" (song), a 2011 single and title track of album above
 "The Lion's Roar", a song by Cynic from the album Kindly Bent to Free Us

See also
 Operation Lion's Roar, part of the Ninawa campaign in northern Iraq in 2008
 "Roar, Lion, Roar", fight song for the Columbia Lions
 Lion's Roar of Queen Srimala, Mahayana Buddhist text
 The Lion Roars Again, 1975 short film featuring many Metro-Goldwyn-Mayer actors, including George Burns
 World War II: When Lions Roared (also known as Then There Were Giants), 1994 TV movie, directed by Joseph Sargent